The  is a Japanese Shinto shrine at Chichibu in Saitama Prefecture.

History
According to text in the Sendai Kuji Hongi (Kujiki), Chichibuhiko-no-mikoto, the tenth-generation descendant of the Kuni no miyatsuko of Chichibu Province, established the shrine in the tenth year of Emperor Sujin to worship Yagokoro-omoikane-no-mikoto.
The shrine contains
 
 
 
 

During the Kamakura period, the shrine merged with a neighboring temple, and was known as Myōken-gū until the separation of Shinto and Buddhism (Shinbutsu bunri) in the late-19th century.
 
In the Edo period, it was one of 34 sacred sites of the old Chichibu Province or Chichibu District.

In the Meiji period it took the name Chichbu Shrine, with the characters 知知夫神社 appearing on the tablet of the torii.

The shrine's grounds include a number of subsidiary shrines. A Tenjin Shrine, Tōshō-gū, and a Suwa Shrine are among them.

Events

The shrine hosts a number of events. The rice-planting festival takes place annually on April 4. The mid-summer Kawase Festival is celebrated on July 19 and 20. The Banba-machi Suwa Shrine festival is not annual, but occasional. It resembles the Onbashira festival of the Suwa Taisha.

Chichibu's annual night festival draws the biggest crowds. Celebrated in December, it spans the first six days of the month. The parading of floats is listed as part of the national cultural heritage.

The national government has also recognized the shrine's sacred dance (kagura) as an important cultural asset. Similar honors have been awarded to its festival music, the floats, buildings and other possessions.

See also
 List of Shinto shrines in Japan
 Modern system of ranked Shinto Shrines

References

This article incorporates material translated from 秩父神社 (Chichibu Jinja) in the Japanese Wikipedia, translated on August 23, 2008.

External links

秩父神社 (Chichibu Jinja) website]

Beppyo shrines
Shinto shrines in Saitama Prefecture